Streamer or streamers may refer to:

 A person who streams online on an online platform like Twitch
 Pennon, a small pointed flag
 Streamer, a kind of confetti consisting of strips of paper or other material
 Streamer, a common name for a Lake-effect snow band
 Streamer bass, a bass guitar produced by the German Warwick company
 Streamer discharge, a type of electrical discharge
 Streamer moth, the geometer moth Anticlea derivata
 Campaign streamer, flag used by military units
 Helmet streamers and pseudostreamers, a bright loop-like structures found over an active regions on the Sun
 Positive streamer, lightning bolt
 Wingtip streamer, tubes of circulating air left behind a wing, also called wingtip vortices
 Serpentine streamer, a party accessory often used as decoration

Aircraft
Keitek Streamer, an Italian ultralight trike design

Technology
 A Digital media player, also called a "Media Streamer" or just a "Streamer"
 Streamer (software)
 Streamer (tape drive)
 Streamer fly, a type of artificial fly fishing lure, used in fly fishing
 Parachute streamer, a Model rocket parachute

Entertainment
 "Streamer", a song by Krokus from Metal Rendez-vous
 Streamers (play), a 1976 play by David Rabe
 Streamers (film), adaptation directed by Robert Altman

See also
 Stream (disambiguation)